German submarine U-3017 was a Type XXI U-boat (one of the "Elektroboote") of Nazi Germany's Kriegsmarine, built for service in World War II. She was ordered on 6 November 1943, and was laid down on 2 September 1944 at AG Weser, Bremen as yard number 1176. She was launched on 5 November 1944, and commissioned under the command of Oberleutnant zur See Rolf Lindschau on 5 January 1945.

Design
Like all Type XXI U-boats, U-3017 had a displacement of  when at the surface and  while submerged. The submarine was powered by two MAN SE supercharged six-cylinder M6V40/46KBB diesel engines each providing , two Siemens-Schuckert GU365/30 double-acting electric motors each providing , and two Siemens-Schuckert silent running GV232/28 electric motors each providing .

U-3017 was fitted with six  torpedo tubes in the bow and four  C/30 anti-aircraft guns. She could carry twenty-three torpedoes or seventeen torpedoes and twelve mines. The complement was five officers and fifty-two men.

Service history
On 9 May 1945, U-3017 surrendered at Horten, Norway, before participating in any war patrols. She was later transferred to Oslo on 18 May 1945, then moved to Lisahally, Northern Ireland on 3 June 1945, arriving on 7 June 1945. U-3017 would be spared, for a time, becoming a British N-class submarine, N41, used for testing and then in November 1949, broken up at Newport, Wales.

References

Bibliography

External links
 

Type XXI submarines
U-boats commissioned in 1945
World War II submarines of Germany
1944 ships
Ships built in Bremen (state)